Sørli is a former municipality in the old Nord-Trøndelag county in Norway. The  municipality existed from 1915 until its dissolution in 1964. The municipality encompassed the southern part of what is now the municipality of Lierne in Trøndelag county. The administrative centre of the municipality was the village of Mebygda.

History

The municipality of Sørli was established on 1 July 1915 when the old municipality of Lierne (Finnlierne) was split in two parts: Nordli (population: 863) in the north and Sørli (population: 739) in the south. The old municipality of Lierne had been created on 1 January 1874 when it was separated from the large municipality of Snåsa. During the 1960s, there were many municipal mergers across Norway due to the work of the Schei Committee. On 1 January 1964, the neighboring municipalities of Sørli (population: 898) and Nordli (population: 1,147) were reunited to once again form the municipality of Lierne.

Name
The municipal name is named after the old name for the region which means "mountainside" (similar to the Norwegian word ). Historically, the prefix Finna- was often added to the name: . Later, the prefix was dropped and the definite plural form of li was used, Lierne. In 1915, the old municipality was divided into two parts: Nordli and Sørli. The names of these new municipalities came from the older name. The definite singular form of the name was used, and the prefix  was added to show that this was the southern part of Li.

Government
While it existed, this municipality was responsible for primary education (through 10th grade), outpatient health services, senior citizen services, unemployment, social services, zoning, economic development, and municipal roads. During its existence, this municipality was governed by a municipal council of elected representatives, which in turn elected a mayor.

Mayors
The mayors of Sørli:

 1915–1919: Hans H. Skjelbred 
 1920–1922: Theodor Brønstad 
 1923–1925: Paul P. Østborg 
 1926–1945: Teodor L. Østnor
 1945-1945: Hans H. Udland
 1946-1946: Frits Gravseth (Ap)
 1946–1955: Emil Gåsbak (LL)
 1956–1963: Ole Strand (V)

Municipal council
The municipal council  of Sørli was made up of representatives that were elected to four year terms. The party breakdown of the final municipal council was as follows:

See also
List of former municipalities of Norway

References

Lierne
Former municipalities of Norway
1915 establishments in Norway
1964 disestablishments in Norway